Vuktyl Airport  is an airport in Russia located 4 km southwest of Vuktyl. It services small airliners and features a very spartan, utilitarian layout.

Airlines and destinations

Airports built in the Soviet Union
Airports in the Komi Republic